Not Tonight may refer to:

"Not Tonight" (song), a song by Lil' Kim
Not Tonight (video game), a role-playing adventure game
"Not Tonight", a version of Bernstein's "Tonight", in the TV series Play It Again
"Not Tonight", a song by the Cars from It's Alive!
"Not Tonight", a 1987 song by Junior Giscombe